Data#3 Limited (DTL) is a publicly traded information and communications technology (ICT) company. Data#3's head office is located in Brisbane, but the business operates across Australia.

Data#3's official listing date on the Australian Stock Exchange (ASX) was 23 December 1997. The company's three lines of business include software, infrastructure and services.

Data#3's was founded in 1977 and established by Powell, Clark and Associates (PCA).

References

External links
Official site

Information technology companies of Australia